Strategic bombing is the use of airpower to destroy industrial and economic infrastructure—such as factories, oil refineries, railroads, or nuclear power plants—rather than just directly targeting military bases, supply depots, or enemy combatants. Strategic bombing may also include the intent to dehouse, demoralize, or inflict civilian casualties, and thus hinders them from supporting the enemy's war effort. The bombing can be utilized by strategic bombers or missiles, and may use general-purpose bombs, guided bombs, incendiary devices, chemical weapons, biological weapons, or nuclear weapons.

This article is currently not comprehensive, but lists strategic bombing of cities and towns, and human death tolls starting from before World War II.

Spanish Civil War (July 18, 1936 – April 1, 1939)

Second Sino-Japanese War (July 7, 1937 – September 1, 1939, merged into World War II on September 1, 1939)

World War II (September 1, 1939 – September 2, 1945)

1991 Gulf War (August 2, 1990 – February 28, 1991)

NATO bombing of Yugoslavia (1999)

Second Chechen War (1999–2009)

Libyan Civil War (2011)

See also
 Aerial bombardment and international law
 Aerial bombing of cities
Casualty recording
Roerich Pact

Notes

References
 
 
 
 
 
 Wetta, Frank J., and Martin A. Novelli. "Good Bombing, Bad Bombing: Hollywood, Air Warfare, and Morality in World War I and World War II." OAH Magazine of History 22.4 (2008): 25-29. online

Strategic bombing
Civilian casualties